The 2022 Alaska gubernatorial election was held on Tuesday November 8, 2022, to elect the governor of Alaska. Incumbent Republican Governor Mike Dunleavy won re-election to a second term, becoming the first Republican governor to be re-elected to a second term since Jay Hammond in 1978 and the first governor, regardless of political affiliation, to be re-elected to a second term since Tony Knowles in 1998.

Following voter approval of Ballot Measure 2 during the 2020 Alaska elections, this was the first gubernatorial election in Alaska held under the new election process. All candidates ran in a nonpartisan blanket top-four primary on August 16, 2022, and the top four candidates advanced to the general election.  

In addition to Dunleavy, Democratic former state representative Les Gara, Independent former governor Bill Walker, and Republican Kenai Peninsula Borough mayor Charlie Pierce advanced to the general election. In the general election, Dunleavy received the majority of votes in the first round, preventing an instant runoff.

Candidates

Republican Party

Advanced to general
Mike Dunleavy, incumbent governor
Running mate: Nancy Dahlstrom, former commissioner of the Alaska Department of Corrections and former state representative
Previous running mate: Kevin Meyer, incumbent lieutenant governor (withdrew December 28, 2021)
Charlie Pierce, Mayor of the Kenai Peninsula Borough
Running mate: Edie Grunwald, chair of the Alaska Parole Board and candidate for lieutenant governor in 2018

Eliminated in primary
David Haeg, hunting guide
Waynette Coleman, nurse
Christopher Kurka, state representative
Running mate: Paul Hueper, activist
Bruce Walden, veteran and author
Running mate: Tanya Lange, social service worker

Declined
Natasha von Imhof, state senator

Democratic Party

Advanced to general
Les Gara, former state representative
Running mate: Jessica Cook, teacher

Declined
Mike Navarre, former Mayor of the Kenai Peninsula Borough and former state representative (endorsed Walker)

Libertarian Party

Eliminated in primary
William S. "Billy" Toien, nominee for governor in 2010 and 2018
Running mate: Shirley Rainbolt

Alaskan Independence Party

Eliminated in primary
 John Howe, machinist and nominee for U.S. Senate in 2020
 Running mate: Shellie Wyatt

Independents

Advanced to general
Bill Walker, former governor
Running mate: Heidi Drygas, former commissioner of the Alaska Department of Labor and Workforce Development

Eliminated in primary
William Nemec, former Denali Borough Assembly member
Running mate: Ronnie Ostrem

Declined
Al Gross, orthopedic surgeon, commercial fisherman, son of former Alaska Attorney General Avrum Gross, and candidate for U.S. Senate in 2020 (ran for U.S. House)

Endorsements

Primary election

Polling

Results

General election

Predictions

Debates

Polling

Mike Dunleavy vs. Les Gara

Mike Dunleavy vs. Bill Walker

Results

See also 
2022 United States gubernatorial elections
2022 United States Senate election in Alaska
2022 United States House of Representatives election in Alaska
2022 Alaska Senate election
2022 Alaska House of Representatives election
 2022 Alaska elections

Notes

Partisan clients

References

External links 
Official campaign websites
 Mike Dunleavy (R) for Governor
 Les Gara (D) for Governor
 Charlie Pierce (R) for Governor
 Bill Walker (I) for Governor

2022
Alaska
Gubernatorial